Tarung Pabin is an Indian politician of Indian National Congress from Arunachal Pradesh.
In the 1990 election for the 37-Pasighat West (ST) Legislative Assembly of Arunachal Pradesh he defeated Tatong Padung

References

Indian National Congress politicians
Arunachal Pradesh MLAs 1990–1995
People from Adi Community
People from East Siang district